Hammerlocke is a 1992-1993 nine issue DC Comics science fiction limited series written by Tom Joyner and Kez Wilson, with artwork by Chris Sprouse and Wilson.

Premise
In the near future, a space elevator called the Olympus Starbridge becomes the battleground between the world government and a radical environmentalist group. Its creator, the cyborg Archer Locke, known as Hammerlocke, is called out of retirement when his daughter is kidnapped by Hugo Tharn, leader of the ecoterrorists and a man determined to destroy the Olympus Starbridge and all it stands for.

Collected editions

The series was scheduled for a 2009 re-release in a trade paperback format with additional material added by the creators but this never happened.

References

1992 comics debuts
DC Comics limited series